The Laser Interferometer Space Antenna (LISA) is a proposed space probe to detect and accurately measure gravitational waves—tiny ripples in the fabric of spacetime—from astronomical sources. LISA would be the first dedicated space-based gravitational wave detector. It aims to measure gravitational waves directly by using laser interferometry. The LISA concept has a constellation of three spacecraft arranged in an equilateral triangle with sides 2.5 million kilometres long, flying along an Earth-like heliocentric orbit. The distance between the satellites is precisely monitored to detect a passing gravitational wave.

The LISA project started out as a joint effort between NASA and the European Space Agency (ESA). However, in 2011, NASA announced that it would be unable to continue its LISA partnership with the European Space Agency due to funding limitations. The project is a recognized CERN experiment (RE8). A scaled down design initially known as the New Gravitational-wave Observatory (NGO) was proposed as one of three large projects in ESA's long term plans. In 2013, ESA selected 'The Gravitational Universe' as the theme for one of its three large projects in the 2030s whereby it committed to launch a space-based gravitational wave observatory.

In January 2017, LISA was proposed as the candidate mission. On June 20, 2017 the suggested mission received its clearance goal for the 2030s, and was approved as one of the main research missions of ESA.

The LISA mission is designed for direct observation of gravitational waves, which are distortions of spacetime travelling at the speed of light. Passing gravitational waves alternately squeeze and stretch space itself by a tiny amount. Gravitational waves are caused by energetic events in the universe and, unlike any other radiation, can pass unhindered by intervening mass. Launching LISA will add a new sense to scientists' perception of the universe and enable them to study phenomena that are invisible in normal light.

Potential sources for signals are merging massive black holes at the centre of galaxies, massive black holes orbited by small compact objects, known as extreme mass ratio inspirals, binaries of compact stars in our Galaxy, and possibly other sources of cosmological origin, such as the very early phase of the Big Bang, and speculative astrophysical objects like cosmic strings and domain boundaries.

Mission description

The LISA mission's primary objective is to detect and measure gravitational waves produced by compact binary systems and mergers of supermassive black holes. LISA will observe gravitational waves by measuring differential changes in the length of its arms, as sensed by laser interferometry. Each of the three LISA spacecraft contains two telescopes, two lasers and two test masses (each a 46 mm, roughly 2 kg, gold-coated cube of gold/platinum), arranged in two optical assemblies pointed at the other two spacecraft. These form Michelson-like interferometers, each centred on one of the spacecraft, with the test masses defining the ends of the arms. The entire arrangement, which is ten times larger than the orbit of the Moon, will be placed in solar orbit at the same distance from the Sun as the Earth, but trailing the Earth by 20 degrees, and with the orbital planes of the three spacecraft inclined relative to the ecliptic by about 0.33 degree, which results in the plane of the triangular spacecraft formation being tilted 60 degrees from the plane of the ecliptic. The mean linear distance between the formation and the Earth will be 50 million kilometres.

To eliminate non-gravitational forces such as light pressure and solar wind on the test masses, each spacecraft is constructed as a zero-drag satellite. The test mass floats free inside, effectively in free-fall, whilst the spacecraft around it absorbs all these local non-gravitational forces. Then, using capacitive sensing to determine the spacecraft's position relative to the mass, very precise thrusters adjust the spacecraft so that it follows, keeping itself centered around the mass.

Arm length 
The longer the arms, the more sensitive the detector is to long-period gravitational waves, but its sensitivity to wavelengths shorter than the arms (2,500,000 km corresponds to  seconds or  Hz) is reduced. As the satellites are free-flying, the spacing is easily adjusted before launch, with upper bounds being imposed by the sizes of the telescopes required at each end of the interferometer (which are constrained by the size of the launch vehicle's payload fairing) and the stability of the constellation orbit (larger constellations are more sensitive to the gravitational effects of other planets, limiting the mission lifetime). Another length-dependent factor which must be compensated for is the "point-ahead angle" between the incoming and outgoing laser beams; the telescope must receive its incoming beam from where its partner was a few seconds ago, but send its outgoing beam to where its partner will be a few seconds from now.

The original 2008 LISA proposal had arms 5 million kilometres (5 Gm) long. When downscoped to eLISA in 2013, arms of 1 million kilometres were proposed.  The approved 2017 LISA proposal has arms 2.5 million kilometres (2.5 Gm) long.

Detection principle

Like most modern gravitational wave observatories, LISA is based on laser interferometry. Its three satellites form a giant Michelson interferometer in which two "transponder" satellites play the role of reflectors and one "master" satellite the roles of source and observer. When a gravitational wave passes the interferometer, the lengths of the two LISA arms vary due to spacetime distortions caused by the wave. Practically, LISA measures a relative phase shift between one local laser and one distant laser by light interference. Comparison between the observed laser beam frequency (in return beam) and the local laser beam frequency (sent beam) encodes the wave parameters. The principle of laser-interferometric inter-satellite ranging measurements was successfully implemented in the Laser Ranging Interferometer onboard GRACE Follow-On.

Unlike terrestrial gravitational wave observatories, LISA cannot keep its arms "locked" in position at a fixed length.  Instead, the distances between satellites vary significantly over each year's orbit, and the detector must keep track of the constantly changing distance, counting the millions of wavelengths by which the distance changes each second.  Then, the signals are separated in the frequency domain: changes with periods of less than a day are signals of interest, while changes with periods of a month or more are irrelevant.

This difference means that LISA cannot use high-finesse Fabry–Pérot resonant arm cavities and signal recycling systems like terrestrial detectors, limiting its length-measurement accuracy.  But with arms almost a million times longer, the motions to be detected are correspondingly larger.

LISA Pathfinder

An ESA test mission called LISA Pathfinder (LPF) was launched in 2015 to test the technology necessary to put a test mass in (almost) perfect free fall conditions. The spacecraft reached its operational location in heliocentric orbit at the Lagrange point L1 on 22 January 2016, where it underwent payload commissioning. Scientific research started on March 8, 2016. The goal of LPF was to demonstrate a noise level 10 times worse than needed for LISA. However, LPF exceeded this goal by a large margin, approaching the LISA requirement noise levels.

Science goals

Gravitational-wave astronomy seeks to use direct measurements of gravitational waves to study astrophysical systems and to test Einstein's theory of gravity. Indirect evidence of gravitational waves was derived from observations of the decreasing orbital periods of several binary pulsars, such as the Hulse–Taylor binary. In February 2016, the Advanced LIGO project announced that it had directly detected gravitational waves from a black hole merger.
 
Observing gravitational waves requires two things: a strong source of gravitational waves—such as the merger of two black holes—and extremely high detection sensitivity. A LISA-like instrument should be able to measure relative displacements with a resolution of 20 picometres—less than the diameter of a helium atom—over a distance of a million kilometres, yielding a strain sensitivity of better than 1 part in 1020 in the low-frequency band about a millihertz.

A LISA-like detector is sensitive to the low-frequency band of the gravitational-wave spectrum, which contains many astrophysically interesting sources. Such a detector would observe signals from binary stars within our galaxy (the Milky Way); signals from binary supermassive black holes in other galaxies; and extreme-mass-ratio inspirals and bursts produced by a stellar-mass compact object orbiting a supermassive black hole. There are also more speculative signals such as signals from cosmic strings and primordial gravitational waves generated during cosmological inflation.

Galactic compact binaries
LISA will be able to detect the nearly monochromatic gravitational waves emanating of close binaries consisting of two compact stellar objects (white dwarfs, neutron stars, and black holes) in the Milky Way. At low frequencies these are actually expected to be so numerous that they form a source of (foreground) noise for LISA data analysis. At higher frequencies LISA is expected to detect and resolve around 25,000 galactic compact binaries. Studying the distribution of the masses, periods, and locations of this population, will teach us about the formation and evolution of binary systems in the galaxy. Furthermore, LISA will be able to resolve 10 binaries currently known from electromagnetic observations (and find ≈500 more with electromagnetic counterparts within one square degree). Joint study of these systems will allow inference on other dissipation mechanisms in these systems, e.g. through tidal interactions. One of the currently known binaries that LISA will be able to resolve is the white dwarf binary ZTF J1539+5027 with a period of 6.91 minutes, the second shortest period binary white dwarf pair discovered to date.

Supermassive black hole mergers
LISA will be able to detect the gravitational waves from the merger of a pair of (super)massive black holes with a chirp mass between 103 and 107 solar masses all the way back to their earliest formation at redshift around z ≈ 15. The most conservative population models expect at least a few such events to happen each year. For mergers closer by (z < 3), it will be able to determine the spins of the components, which carry information about the past evolution of the components (e.g. whether they have grown primarily through accretion or mergers). For mergers around the peak of star formation (z ≈ 2) LISA will be able to locate mergers within 100 square degrees on the night sky at least 24 hours before the actual merger, allowing electromagnetic telescopes to search for counterparts, with the potential of witnessing the formation of a quasar after a merger.

Extreme mass ratio inspirals

Extreme mass ratio inspirals (EMRIs) consist of a stellar compact object (<60 solar masses) on a slowly decaying orbit around a massive black hole of around 105 solar masses. For the ideal case of a prograde orbit around a (nearly) maximally spinning black hole, LISA will be able to detect these events up to z = 4. EMRIs are interesting because they are slowly evolving, spending around 105 orbits and between a few months and a few years in the LISA sensitivity band before merging. This allows very accurate (up to an error of 1 in  104)  measurements of the properties of the system, including the mass and spin of the central object and the mass and orbital elements (eccentricity and inclination) of the smaller object. EMRIs are expected to occur regularly in the centers of most galaxies and in dense star clusters. Conservative population estimates predict at least one detectable event per year for LISA.

Intermediate mass black hole binaries
LISA will also be able to detect the gravitational waves emanating from black hole binary mergers where the lighter black hole is in the intermediate black hole range (between 102 and 104 solar masses). In the case of both components being intermediate black holes between 600 and 104 solar masses, LISA will be able to detect events up to redshifts around 1. In the case of an intermediate mass black hole spiralling into a massive black hole (between 104 and 106 solar masses) events will be detectable up to at least z = 3. Since little is known about the population of intermediate mass black holes, there is no good estimate of the event rates for these events.

Multi-band gravitational wave astronomy
Following the announcement of the first gravitational wave detection, GW150914, it was realized that a similar event would be detectable by LISA well before the merger. Based on the LIGO estimated event rates, it is expected that LISA will detect and resolve about 100 binaries that would merge a few weeks to months later in the LIGO detection band. LISA will be able to accurately predict the time of merger ahead of time and locate the event with 1 square degree on the sky. This will greatly aid the possibilities for searches for electromagnetic counterpart events.

Fundamental black hole physics
Gravitational wave signals from black holes could provide hints at a more fundamental theory of gravity. LISA will be able to test possible modifications of Einstein's general theory of relativity, motivated by dark energy or dark matter. These could manifest, for example, through modifications of the propagation of gravitational waves, or through the possibility of hairy black holes.

Probe expansion of the universe
LISA will be able to independently measure the redshift and distance of events occurring relatively close by (z < 0.1) through the detection of massive black hole mergers and EMRIs. Consequently, it can make an independent measurement of the Hubble parameter H0 that does not depend on the use of the cosmic distance ladder. The accuracy of such a determination is limited by the sample size and therefore the mission duration. With a mission lifetime of 4 years one expects to be able to determine H0 with an absolute error of 0.01 (km/s)/Mpc. At larger ranges LISA events can (stochastically) be linked to electromagnetic counterparts, to further constrain the expansion curve of the universe.

Gravitational wave background
LISA will be sensitive to the stochastic gravitational wave background generated in the early universe through various channels, including inflation, first order phase transitions related to spontaneous symmetry breaking, and cosmic strings.

Exotic sources
LISA will also search for currently unknown (and unmodelled) sources of gravitational waves. The history of astrophysics has shown that whenever a new frequency range/medium of detection is available new unexpected sources show up. This could for example include kinks and cusps in cosmic strings.

Other gravitational-wave experiments 

Previous searches for gravitational waves in space were conducted for short periods by planetary missions that had other primary science objectives (such as Cassini–Huygens), using microwave Doppler tracking to monitor fluctuations in the Earth–spacecraft distance. By contrast, LISA is a dedicated mission that will use laser interferometry to achieve a much higher sensitivity.
Other gravitational wave antennas, such as LIGO, VIRGO, and GEO 600, are already in operation on Earth, but their sensitivity at low frequencies is limited by the largest practical arm lengths, by seismic noise, and by interference from nearby moving masses. Thus, LISA and ground detectors are complementary rather than competitive, much like astronomical observatories in different electromagnetic bands (e.g., ultraviolet and infrared).

History
The first design studies for gravitational wave detector to be flown in space were performed in the 1980s under the name LAGOS (Laser Antena for Gravitational radiation Observation in Space). LISA was first proposed as a mission to ESA in the early 1990s. First as a candidate for the M3-cycle, and later as 'cornerstone mission' for the 'Horizon 2000 plus' program. As the decade progressed, the design was refined to a triangular configuration of three spacecraft with three 5-million-kilometre arms. This mission was pitched as a joint mission between ESA and NASA in 1997.

In the 2000s the joint ESA/NASA LISA mission was identified as a candidate for the 'L1' slot in ESA's Cosmic Vision 2015–2025 programme. However, due to budget cuts, NASA announced in early 2011 that it would not be contributing to any of ESA's L-class missions. ESA nonetheless decided to push the program forward, and instructed the L1 candidate missions to present reduced cost versions that could be flown within ESA's budget. A reduced version of LISA was designed with only two 1-million-kilometre arms under the name NGO (New/Next Gravitational wave Observatory). Despite NGO being ranked highest in terms of scientific potential, ESA decided to fly Jupiter Icy Moon Explorer (JUICE) as its L1 mission. One of the main concerns was that the LISA Pathfinder mission had been experiencing technical delays, making it uncertain if the technology would be ready for the projected L1 launch date.

Soon afterwards, ESA announced it would be selecting themes for its Large class L2 and L3 mission slots. A theme called "the Gravitational Universe" was formulated with the reduced NGO rechristened eLISA as a straw-man mission.  In November 2013, ESA announced that it selected "the Gravitational Universe" for its L3 mission slot (expected launch in 2034). Following the successful detection of gravitational waves by the LIGO, ground-based detectors in September 2015, NASA expressed interest in rejoining the mission as a junior partner. In response to an ESA call for mission proposals for the `Gravitational Universe' themed L3 mission, a mission proposal for a detector with three 2.5-million-kilometre arms again called LISA was submitted in January 2017.

As of November 2021, LISA is expected to launch in 2037.

See also 

 Beyond Einstein program – NASA
 Big Bang Observer – proposed LISA successor
 Cosmic Vision program – ESA
 DECIGO – proposed Japanese space based gravitational wave observatory

References

External links 

Interferometric gravitational-wave instruments
European Space Agency space probes
Space telescopes
Proposed space probes
Future spaceflights
2037 in science
Cosmic Vision
Space-based laser
CERN experiments